Miss Teen USA 2008, the 26th Miss Teen USA pageant, was held on August 16, 2008 at Grand Ballroom in the Atlantis Paradise Island, Nassau, Bahamas. This was the first Miss Teen USA pageant that was not televised, after then-Miss Universe Organization broadcast partner NBC failed to renew its contract, and it was also the first Miss Teen USA pageant broadcasting only online by  Ustream and the first held outside the United States. The pageant was hosted by Seth Goldman and Miss Teen USA 2004, Shelley Hennig.
At the conclusion of the pageant, outgoing titleholder Hilary Cruz crowned her successor Stevi Perry of Arkansas as the new Miss Teen USA.

Results

Placements

Special awards
Miss Congeniality:  Mississippi - Elizabeth Hollomon
Miss Photogenic:  New York - Sana Idnani

Historical significance 
 Arkansas wins competition for the first time. Also becoming in the 24th state who wins Miss Teen USA.
 South Carolina earns the 1st runner-up position for the first time and it reaches the highest placement since Vanessa Minnillo won Miss Teen USA 1998.
 North Carolina earns the 2nd runner-up position for the second time and it repeats the placement from the previous year.
 Louisiana earns the 3rd runner-up position for the first time and it reaches the highest placement since Shelley Hennig won Miss Teen USA 2004.
 Idaho earns the 4th runner-up position for the first time and it reaches the highest placement since Brandi Sherwood won Miss Teen USA 1989.
 States that placed in semifinals the previous year were Alabama, Colorado,  North Carolina, South Carolina, and Virginia.
 Virginia placed in the fourth consecutive year.
 North Carolina and South Carolina placed in the third consecutive year.
 Alabama and Colorado placed in the second consecutive year.
 Arizona, Florida and Oklahoma last placed in 2006.
 California last placed in 2005.
 Louisiana last placed in 2004.
 Massachusetts last placed in 2003.
 Pennsylvania last placed in 2000 since Jillian Parry won the title.
 New Hampshire last placed in 1991 since Janel Bishop won the title.
 Idaho last placed in 1989.
 Arkansas last placed in 1985.

Delegates
The Miss Teen USA 2008 delegates are:

Galleries

Groups

Contestants

Judges
Alina Shriver, Founder of Shriver Art.
Farouk Shami, Founder and Chairman of Farouk Systems.
Heather Kerzner, of Kerzner International.
Alicia Bridgewater, Bookings Editor at Cosmo Girl Magazine.
Duane Gazi, Director of Scouting and Development at Trump Model Management.
Eric Parrinello, founder and owner of Bacchanalia Private Dining in Overland Park, Kansas.
David Dzanis, Vice President of Pepsi-Cola Client Services at Genesco Sports Enterprises.
Seth Mayeri, Television Talent Veteran.

See also
Miss USA 2008
Miss Universe 2008

Notes

External links
Miss Teen USA official website

2008
2008 in the Bahamas
2008 beauty pageants